is a Canadian former professional footballer.

Personal 
Paris was born in Tokyo to an English–Zimbabwean father and Japanese mother. At the age of four, he moved to England with his family, and returned to Japan ten years later to play football with the youth team of the J-League club Yokohama F. Marinos. His brother Issey is also a professional footballer. Paris has Canadian and British citizenship, and is a graduate of Yokohama International School, where he played alongside Mike Havenaar.

Club career
Paris played for the Yokohama F. Marinos youth team from 2004 until 2007. He went professional in 2007 at the age of 17, after signing a two-year contract with Danish 1st Division team Næstved Boldklub. In September 2009, Paris joined his brother at AC Horsens on a 1-year deal. In July 2011, he signed with Hong Kong First Division League club South China AA, but was released by the club on 7 January 2012.
Later that year he joined Spanish third division side CE Europa, and played mostly for the second team. Paris also had a stint with Japanese fifth Division outfit, Dezzolla Shimane, before joining Tokyo 23 FC which plays in the Kantō Soccer League.

International
In January 2008, Paris got his first international call in up for the winter training camp held in Florida for the Canadian national team. He also trained with Canada's U-23 Olympic squad in March 2008. Paris earned his first cap for Canada U-20 in an exhibition match against Argentina in May 2008, starting at right back. He has also represented the Canadian U-20 side during the 2009 edition of the Francophone Games hosted by Lebanon.

References

External links
South China AA FC Player Profile

1989 births
Living people
Association football people from Tokyo Metropolis
People educated at Yokohama International School
Canadian soccer players
Canadian expatriate soccer players
Canada men's youth international soccer players
Canadian people of Zimbabwean descent
Canadian people of English descent
Canadian sportspeople of Japanese descent
Association football defenders
Association football midfielders
Yokohama F. Marinos players
Næstved Boldklub players
AC Horsens players
South China AA players
CE Europa footballers
Tokyo 23 FC players
Danish 1st Division players
Hong Kong Premier League players
Expatriate men's footballers in Denmark
Expatriate footballers in Hong Kong
Expatriate footballers in Spain
Canadian expatriate sportspeople in Denmark
Canadian expatriate sportspeople in Spain